Mitesh Rameshbhai Patel (known as Bakabhai) is an Indian politician. He was elected to the Lok Sabha, lower house of the Parliament of India from Anand, Gujarat in the 2019 Indian general election as a member of the Bharatiya Janata Party. He recorded a victory by 1,97,718 votes, which is known to be the highest ever in the history of Anand Constituency.
He defeated Bharatbhai Solanki of Congress, who served as Minister of State under UPAII and is also the son of heavyweight leader MadhavSinh Solanki who served as CM of Gujarat and Minister of External Affairs in Narasimha Rao government.
'''

Career
He has been associated with the BJP since his young days. He has been the Treasurer of Anand, BJP for several years where he worked intensely at the ground level to strengthen the party. He worked very closely with the Co-operative societies of Anand. 
He has always worked for the betterment of society. BJP's top leadership considered him for the seat after seeing his dedication and commitment level.

Notable work
With in 2 years of winning the Loksabha election he is said to have build Water Harvesting Plants in several Government schools. 
The welfare work done by him during the Covid-19 pandemic was tremendous for which he has been awarded with Certificate of Commitment by the World Book of Records, London. 
It is him who coined the line - "Sewa hi Samarpan" which was later picked up by the BJP National leadership as the title for a welfare campaign.

Parliamentary Committees
1. Member, Standing Committee on Food, Consumer Affairs and Public Distribution.

2. Member, Standing Committee on Petroleum and Natural Gas.

3. Member, Consultative Committee on Coal and Mines.

References

External links
Official biographical sketch in Parliament of India website
Official website

India MPs 2019–present
Lok Sabha members from Gujarat
Living people
Bharatiya Janata Party politicians from Gujarat
1965 births